Artem Anatoliyovych Shtanko (born 6 September 1980) is a Ukrainian football goalkeeper.

References

External links
 Career summary by sportbox.ru

1980 births
Living people
Ukrainian footballers
Ukraine student international footballers
Ukrainian expatriate footballers
Expatriate footballers in Russia
MFC Mykolaiv players
FC Kryvbas Kryvyi Rih players
FC Obolon-Brovar Kyiv players
PFC Sumy players
Ukrainian Premier League players
FC Luch Vladivostok players
Association football goalkeepers